Andrew Willett (born 23 August 1970) is an Australian former rugby union and rugby league footballer who played in the 1990s and 2000s. He played his rugby union career at the Northern Suburbs Rugby Club. He played his rugby league career at the South Sydney Rabbitohs.

Playing career
Willett was a schoolboy rugby union representative with the Sydney Combined High Schools side. He was graded by the Northern Suburbs Rugby Club in 1989. Willett holds the distinction of scoring the most points in a match for Northern Suburbs (35 points against Drummoyne DRFC in 1993). Willett's stint with Northern Suburbs ended at the conclusion of the 1994 season.

Willett switched to rugby league in 1995, signing with ARL side the South Sydney Rabbitohs. He made his first grade debut on the wing in his side's 42−18 loss to the Manly Warringah Sea Eagles at the Sydney Football Stadium in round 1 of the 1995 season. His stint with the Rabbitohs and in rugby league ended at the conclusion of the 1995 season. He kicked 35 goals, and despite playing all 14 of his games on the wing, he holds the unusual distinction of being the most recent player with starts only on the wing who failed to cross the stripe in any of his appearances.

Willett returned to rugby union in 1996, and played for the Australia national rugby sevens team in 2000.

References

1970 births
Living people
Australian rugby league players
Australian rugby union players
Rugby league players from Sydney
Rugby league wingers
Rugby union players from Sydney
South Sydney Rabbitohs players